Megachile vanduzeei is a species of bee in the family Megachilidae. It was described by Theodore Cockerell in 1924.

References

Vanduzeei
Insects described in 1924